ShareAction is a registered charity that promotes Responsible Investment.

ShareAction aims to improve corporate behaviour on environmental, social and governance issues. The charity has launched numerous campaigns, building capacity among savers, charities, unions, faith groups and other civil society organisations to engage with investors to bring about change. ShareAction’s work recognises that the money individuals and organisations put into the investment system funds global corporations, who in turn have the power to change business practices that are harmful to people or the environment.

A key aim is to democratise the financial system so that ordinary savers have more influence over how their money is invested. ShareAction engages with investors, pension funds, asset managers, individuals, charities and policy makers to achieve its mission.

ShareAction has been highly commended three times in the Charity Awards, most recently in 2015 for its AGM Army project.

ShareAction is based in London, United Kingdom. Catherine Howarth is the current Chief Executive.

History 
In the 1990s a campaign called 'Ethics for USS' led by the student network People & Planet aimed to make the Universities Superannuation Scheme listen to members’ concerns about the scheme’s investments. As a result, USS became the first pension fund to formally adopt a socially responsible and sustainable investment policy. This led to the establishment of a national organisation to champion Responsible Investment. FairPensions – the charity’s first operational name – was born.

Early campaigns included ‘Patents v Patients’ in 2007, a campaign to stop pharmaceutical company Novartis' legal challenge against India's patent law to develop generic drugs. ShareAction worked with Oxfam to mobilise savers and institutional investors to put pressure on the company, highlighting the reputational risk of pursuing the claim. In August 2007 Novartis dropped its appeal, ensuring a key supply of low-cost drugs to the developing world was protected.

In 2006 ShareAction published its first survey of pension schemes, examining the existence and transparency of investment policies on environmental, social and governance issues. The charity has since published many surveys ranking both pension funds and asset managers on such issues.

In 2010 ShareAction co-ordinated shareholder resolutions at BP and Shell, asking them to publish details of the risks associated with their controversial tar sands project in Canada. Over 6000 supporters emailed their pension funds asking them to support the resolutions; consequently, an unprecedented number of shareholders went against the companies’ recommendations to vote against the resolutions, sparking conversations between investors, companies and savers. The campaign was a turning point in the use of ‘pension power’ to effect change.

Campaigns 
ShareAction uses the power of the investment system to campaign against company practices which are environmentally or socially damaging or which represent poor governance practice, and to promote responsible investment through the investment chain.

The charity engages with investors and companies to promote the value and business sense of investing responsibly, as well as encouraging individual supporters to take action.

Shareholder activism 
ShareAction trains and supports individual and organisations to use shareholder activism as a way to engage with major companies. It also collaborates with institutional investors to leverage shareholder influence. ShareAction's AGM activists attend the annual general meetings (AGMs) of publicly listed companies to ask questions about key environment, social, and governance issues. Individuals have raised issues concerning high pay, corporate tax, corporate lobbying, digital rights, human trafficking, renewable energy, and board diversity.

Policy & research 
ShareAction engages with policy-makers and the investment industry to promote responsible investment and transparency to the savers whose money underpins the investment system. The aim is to encourage a policy framework that makes the investment system more democratic and accountable, and ensures all risks and opportunities, including those relating to environmental, social and governance factors are properly considered by institutional investors.

ShareAction regularly publishes research on issues relating to responsible investment. This includes reports which provide independent analysis and help shape public policy debate. In July 2015, ShareAction published a report outlining its vision for UK workplace pensions which called for less regulation and better member representation.

The charity also undertakes industry surveys which examine and rank the responsible investment performance of the UK’s largest pension funds and fund managers. These surveys provide independent analysis and have become respected industry benchmarks. ShareAction’s latest survey examined how frequently asset managers sided with company management advice on controversial decisions such as pay in 2014.

Responsible investment networks 
ShareAction hosts networks for individuals and organisations interested in responsible investment. These include the Charities Responsible Investment Network (CRIN), the European Responsible Investment Network (ERIN), as well as various networks for investors, shareholders, and pension savers. ShareAction provides support to members including training, research, resources and opportunities for engagement with companies and policymakers.

References 

Official website

Charities based in London